Mordellistena bavarica is a beetle in the genus Mordellistena of the family Mordellidae. It was described in 1963 by Ermisch.

References

bavarica
Beetles described in 1963